Sudden Impact is an Australian observational documentary series that airs on the Nine Network. It debuted on 9 December 2008 at 8pm. The program was developed in association with the Transport Accident Commission (TAC), and is narrated by Gary Sweet. The program is largely set in Victoria. The series is similar to the New Zealand based show Serious Crash Unit and Seven Network's Crash Investigation Unit.

References

External links 
 Official website
 WTFN Entertainment

Nine Network original programming
2008 Australian television series debuts
2009 Australian television series endings
Australian factual television series